Lee Hurst (born 16 October 1962) is an English comedian.

Hurst was a regular panellist on the comedy sports quiz They Think It's All Over from 1995 to 1997.

Career
Hurst took up comedy after being employed in a number of jobs after leaving school, including working for a building society, the Department of Health and Social Security, and as a telephone engineer for BT. He made his first appearance on stage at the Donmar Warehouse and later said that, at the time, "I only had four jokes and they were really crap but I told the first one and got a huge laugh. I couldn't believe it. I thought, 'This is all right'".

In February 2009 Hurst pleaded guilty to criminal damage after smashing an audience member's mobile phone at a comedy show in Guildford in September 2008. Hurst said that he did it out of anger, claiming that his shows regularly appear on websites such as YouTube.

Television work

They Think It's All Over
Hurst got a break when he became the warm-up act for Have I Got News for You and producer Harry Thompson gave him the opportunity to appear on the show as a guest.

Hurst first became known to television viewers as a regular team member on the BBC Two comedy sports quiz They Think It's All Over.  Hurst was one of the show’s original panellists despite openly admitting to knowing nothing about football or comedy. He appeared alongside David Gower in 42 episodes over the first six series, from the first episode on 14 September 1995 until 1997.

He reduced his TV appearances to allow more time for running his comedy club, Lee Hurst's Backyard Comedy Club. He returned for two appearances as a guest on They Think It's All Over towards the end of its run for series 17 in 2004, and for the 2011 Comic Relief 24 Hour Panel People.

Other television credits

Hurst's other TV credits include presenting Shark Tank, Salvage Squad and The Warehouse, and guest appearances on That's Showbusiness, The Stand Up Show and Have I Got News for You. He has also appeared as a regular panellist on Don't Give Up Your Day Job. He also fronted ITV's short-lived revival of the entertainment show Saturday Live.

Have I Got News for You: two appearances in 1994 and 1995
1996 Saturday Live: 6 episodes
2002 Salvage Squad: series 1
The Wright Stuff: three runs, in March 2012, November 2014 and February 2015

Writing
Hurst was the creator of Bring Me the Head of Light Entertainment, which ran for five series on Five between 1997 and 2000.

Personal life

Hurst has a severe form of arthritis called ankylosing spondylitis, a condition which causes acute back and joint pain.

Hurst lives in Sittingbourne, Kent.

Politics
Hurst refuses to be interviewed by newspapers owned by Rupert Murdoch, was a critic of the Blair government, and in one interview, stated that he stopped attending a back support group which helped him with his ankylosing spondylitis after he found out that it was run as a charity, explaining that "I believe it should be provided by the State through taxation. I'd be very hypocritical if I used their facilities when I won't do medical charity benefits".

In 2003, he considered standing as a candidate in the 2004 London mayoral election. One of the factors behind his decision was a proposed redevelopment, which would have seen his comedy club demolished.

In March 2021, Hurst tweeted a sexual joke about climate activist Greta Thunberg, saying, "As soon as Greta discovers cock, she'll stop complaining about the single use plastic it's wrapped in". Thunberg was 18 years old at the time, and Hurst was 58. The tweet gained widespread criticism with fellow comedian David Baddiel among those criticising the joke. Hurst responded by describing his critics as "the usual suspects". The tweet was reported, leading to Hurst getting suspended from Twitter, which he stated he had appealed. Twitter later reversed Hurst's suspension. He was again suspended from Twitter in June 2021 for inciting violence; in the week that a video of Chris Whitty being manhandled went viral, he tweeted that "whatever happened to [him] is not enough".

Hurst opposes COVID vaccinations, lockdowns and mask wearing.

Stand-up videos
Live (3 November 1997)
Live at the Backyard Comedy Club (16 November 1998)

References

External links
 

1962 births
Living people
People from the London Borough of Tower Hamlets
20th-century English comedians
21st-century English comedians
British Telecom people
Male critics of feminism
Critics of the United Nations